A foreign agent in Russia is a person, from the point of view of the Russian government, who receives funding from abroad and participates in political activities, dissemination of information as a mass media or collection of military-technical information.

Foreign agent in Russia 
The state imposes a number of restrictions and requirements on the activities of "foreign agents". As of March 2021, “foreign agents” in Russia are divided into three groups, which were defined by law in different years:

 Non-profit organizations-foreign agents - since 2012.
 Media-foreign agents - since 2017.
 Individuals-foreign agents" from 2020.An individual - "foreign agent" may be additionally recognized by the media, which entails for him the obligation to register the corresponding legal entity.
 Unregistered public associations-foreign agents - from 2021.

Registers (lists) of foreign agents are maintained by the Ministry of Justice of the Russian Federation (Minister since 2020 - Konstantin Chuychenko), adding information to them or deleting organizations from there.

The law provides for the obligation of an organization performing the functions of a foreign agent to independently report this to the Ministry of Justice, initiating its inclusion in the register. However, the Ministry of Justice of the Russian Federation may establish the status of an NPO as a “foreign agent” on its own initiative and require the NPO to apply for inclusion in the register. If an NPO refuses to submit such an application, the Ministry of Justice has the right to fine the organization or suspend its work for up to six months. The decision of the Ministry of Justice can be challenged in court.

Starting from 1 December 2022, a unified register of foreign agents is maintained..

History 
Since the inclusion in the register was seen by many as placing a negative label on NGOs, which damaged their reputation and presented NGOs as a kind of hostile element (due to the interpretation of the phrase “foreign agent” as a synonym for the phrase “foreign spy”), after the adoption of the law, NGOs were not particularly active fulfilled his requirements. Thus, as of 1 August 2014, only 11 organizations were included in the register, despite the fact that officials, just four months after the adoption of the law, announced 654 organizations - potential candidates for being included in the list..At the same time, although a number of experts point out the need to account for "foreign agents" as lobbyists, it is believed that damage to reputation persists even after the organization is excluded from the register.

In the future, the number of NGOs in the register began to increase. So, as of March 2017, there were already 102 organizations in the register, while some of them managed to achieve a formal exclusion. However, the Ministry of Justice continued to list them on its website, indicating the date and reason for the termination of the status of "foreign agent". The maintenance of the register was regulated by a departmental order of the Ministry of Justice, which did not provide for the complete deletion of information, and, moreover, was applied inconsistently. So, in October 2015, information about organizations that were excluded from it briefly disappeared from the register, but then this information quickly returned to the register.As a result, in January 2016, the Kostroma Center for the Support of Public Initiatives appealed to the Supreme Court against the order of the Ministry of Justice on the procedure for maintaining the register of non-profit organizations performing the functions of a “foreign agent”, stating that it contradicts the federal law on NGOs and that the continued presence in the published register of an organization that ceased to perform the functions of a “foreign agent”, damages its business reputation. As a result of legal proceedings, despite the initial position of the Ministry of Justice on the compliance of this procedure for maintaining the register with the law, the order was corrected, and information about organizations that ceased to perform the functions of a “foreign agent” was completely excluded from the register in March 2017. The columns on the date and reason for the exclusion in the registry itself remained.

Statistics 
According to Deutsche Welle, out of 200 NGOs recognized as “foreign agents” from 2013 to February 2021, 45 no longer perform the functions of a “foreign agent”, 56 have voluntarily dissolved themselves, 16 have been liquidated by the court, 8 have been excluded from the Unified State Register of Legal Entities and 75 remain in the register . The following profiles are in the registry:

 15 — human rights
 14 — civic education,
 8 — fight against HIV,
 7 — media support,
 7 — helping those in need,
 23 — other.

Among them are 25 organizations from Moscow, 13 from St. Petersburg, 7 from Yekaterinburg and 30 from other regions of Russia.

List

External links

References 

Lists of Russian people by occupation
Russia-related lists
Lists of organizations
Russian foreign agent law